Emelia Isabel Coloma Pardo (born 18 October 1988) is an Ecuadorian former footballer who played as a midfielder. She has been a member of the Ecuador women's national team.

International career
Coloma capped for Ecuador at senior level during the 2006 South American Women's Football Championship.

References

External links

1988 births
Living people
Women's association football midfielders
Ecuadorian women's footballers
Sportspeople from Guayaquil
Ecuador women's international footballers
21st-century Ecuadorian women